RBE is relative biological effectiveness, a health physics concept.

RBE may also refer to:
Rock County Airport, Nebraska, United States: FAA LID code RBE
Ratanakiri Airport, Cambodia: IATA code RBE
Resource-Based Economy

See also
RBE2, a multirole radar  developed during the 90s for the French Rafale combat aircraft